Corymbia gummifera, commonly known as red bloodwood, is a species of tree, rarely a mallee, that is endemic to eastern Australia. It has rough, tessellated bark on the trunk and branches, lance-shaped adult leaves, flower buds in groups of seven, creamy white flowers and urn-shaped fruit.

Description
Juvenile leaves are opposite on the stem for a few pairs, then disjunct. Flowering occurs from December to June and the flowers are creamy white.

Taxonomy
The red bloodwood was first formally described in 1788 by Joseph Gaertner who gave it the name Metrosideros gummifera and published the description in his book De Fructibus et Seminibus Plantarum. (The name is often given as Metrosideros gummifera Sol. ex Gaertn., but Gaertner did not ascribe the name to Solander.) 

The name Eucalyptus corymbosa, published by James Edward Smith in his 1795 A Specimen of the Botany of New Holland, is regarded as a synonym by the Australian Plant Census. Eucalyptus corymbosus, published in 1797 by Cavanilles in his book Icones et Descriptiones Plantarum is an orthographical variant. Eucalyptus oppositifolia, published in 1804 by Desfontaines is a nomen nudum because no description was provided. Eucalyptus purpurascens var. petiolaris, published in 1828 by de Candolle is regarded as a synonym. Eucalyptus longifolia, published in 1920 by Joseph Maiden is an invalid name because it had already been used for a different species. 

In 1995 Ken Hill and Lawrie Johnson changed the name to Corymbia gummifera.

Distribution and habitat
Corymbia gummifera mainly occurs on flats and low hills along the coast between the extreme eastern corner of Victoria and south-eastern Queensland. It grows best on moist, rich, loamy soil, but is also commonly found on poorer sandy soils.

Uses
The heartwood of C. gummifera is very strong and durable, but has extensive gum lines. It is used for rough construction purposes, such as poles, sleepers, fencing and mining timbers.
Corymbia gummifera may be used as a rootstock, onto which the ornamental C. ficifolia is grafted.

References

gummifera
Myrtales of Australia
Flora of New South Wales
Flora of Queensland
Flora of Victoria (Australia)
Trees of Australia
Plants described in 1788